Kanai may refer to:

the Kanai, an ethnic group of Jews who settled the Kerala region in India.
Kanai (Judaism), a zealot in the scriptures
Kanai (surname), a Japanese surname
Kanai Anzen, an amulet
Nirai Kanai, an Okinawan myth
Nirai Kanai (MAX song), song by MAX based on the Okinawan myth
Kainai Nation
Kanai, Nigeria
Kurnai language
Kanai of Kamen Rider Blade, human guise of the Giraffe Stag Undead
Canae, an ancient city in the Arginusae

See also
 Kanhai (disambiguation)